No Limit is the tenth extended play of the South Korean boy group Monsta X. It was released by Starship Entertainment and distributed by Kakao Entertainment on November 19, 2021.

Background and release 
The EP was announced on October 24. The tracklist was announced on November 5, with the EP having seven tracks, including the title track "Rush Hour". Joohoney was a co-producer for "Rush Hour", as well as writing lyrics for the title track alongside I.M, who was also a co-writer and a co-producer for the tracks "Autobahn" and "Just Love", while Hyungwon was a co-writer and a co-producer for the track "Mercy". The EP does not feature group member Shownu, due to him serving his mandatory military enlistment.

Monsta X held a comeback showcase on Universe to introduce the EP alongside its title track on November 18. On November 23, they appeared on Kim Young-chul's SBS Power FM. On that same day, Monsta X showed up on MBC's Idol Radio hosted by members Hyungwon and Joohoney. On November 25, they appeared on SBS' MMTG's Civilization Express hosted by Jaejae. On December 1, Monsta X wrapped up their official activities for the comeback on Naver Now's Midnight Idol hosted by members Kihyun and I.M.

The physical EP was released in four standard versions, with the addition of jewel cases version and KiT version.

Composition 
No Limit contains Monsta X's determination to go straight for the world with spirit and confidence, while shining brighter in the age of infinite competition, and also proving the infinite possibilities of "limitless" in any situation.

"Rush Hour" is a hip hop-EDM song expressing the plethoric nature of the K-pop industry as heavy traffic, "Autobahn" is a song with club-ready electronic beat, "Ride with U" is trap beats meet the faintest trace of funk song, "Got Me in Chains" is a song with striking layers of techno and R&B, "Just Love" is a gentle meld of pop and R&B song, "Mercy" is a dark and foreboding song with gothic sonic elements, and "I Got Love" is a generic blend of trap and hip hop song.

Critical reception

Reviewing the EP for NME, Carmen Chin showed that it upholds the group's ambition "to unashamedly evolve into musicians who break barriers" and it delivers "quality music shaped by the very hands of Monsta X", with all the tracks "flaunt[ing] either writing or production credits from two or more members of the group at a time". 

Divyansha Dongre, writing for Rolling Stone India, wrote that "Rush Hour" captures the group's "vocal prowess and mastery in the hip hop-EDM sphere", adding that its confidence-inspiring lyrical arrangement "effortlessly encapsulates the group's strengths that contributed to their dynamic growth since their debut in 2015".

Listicles

Commercial performance
The EP debuted at number four on the monthly Gaon Album Chart and sold more than 400,000 copies in its first month of release in South Korea. Monsta X also received their first Hanteo Chart Silver Certification Plaque for achieving more than 280,000 copies in Initial Chodong sales with No Limit and surpassing their previous record of 197,841 copies with One of a Kind in its first week of release in South Korea.
	
"Rush Hour" peaked at number 75 on the weekly Gaon Digital Chart, while it debuted at number 142 on the monthly Gaon Digital Chart, making it the group's first entry on the monthly chart for digitals. The track also debuted at number 11 on the weekly Billboard World Digital Song Sales chart, and at number 69 on the weekly Billboard K-pop Hot 100. All the other tracks on the EP did not appear on the Gaon Digital Chart, but did appear on its component, the Gaon Download Chart, with "Autobahn" peaking at 55, "Ride with U" at 59, "Just Love" at 62, "Mercy" at 64, "I Got Love" at 65, and "Got Me in Chains" at 67. It is a career high for Monsta X for number of music program wins, achieving a total of five trophies upon the group's two weeks of promotions, two from The Show, two from Show Champion, and one from Music Bank.

Track listing

Charts

Album

Weekly charts

Monthly chart

Year-end chart

Songs

Weekly charts

Monthly chart

Certification and sales

Accolades

Release history

See also
 List of K-pop songs on the Billboard charts
 List of K-pop songs on the World Digital Song Sales chart
 List of Gaon Album Chart number ones of 2021

References 

2021 EPs
Korean-language EPs
Monsta X EPs
Starship Entertainment EPs